The men's tournament at the 2019 World Team Ninepin Bowling Classic Championships were held in Rokycany, Czech Republic, from 16 to 26 May 2019.

Serbia captured their fifth title by defeating Germany 6–2 in the final match. Bronze was secured by Hungary who beat Croatia 6–2.

Participating teams

Draw

Groups

Group stage

Group A 

|}

Group B 

|}

Group C 

|}

Group D 

|}

Final Round

Bracket

Quarterfinals

Semifinals

Third place game

Final

Final standing

Footnotes

References 

2019
2019 World Team Ninepin Bowling Classic Championships